At-location mapping (ALM) is closely related to location-based services (LBS). However, ALM focuses on the delivery of maps 'at location', using mobile devices that are enabled with Global Positioning System (GPS) technology. At-location mapping devices, like personal digital assistants (PDAs) or cellular telephones, deliver maps on small screens that can be used for navigation or wayfinding. The attributes of these maps are that they are small, perhaps only 100 × 100 pixels and they must work adequately on small colour screens. ALM is a developing area that contributes geographical content to services provided by mobile devices using the mobile Internet of cellular telephone services.

Geographic information systems
Location-based software